Shortall is a surname. Notable people with the surname include:

 Brian Shortall, Laois footballer
 Jessica Shortall, strategy consultant, social entrepreneur, LGBTQ advocate, and author
 Róisín Shortall (born 1954), Irish politician
 Stacey Shortall, New Zealand lawyer
 Andy Shortall, Dublin soccer player